Megarhyssa, also known as giant ichneumonid wasps, giant ichneumons, or stump stabbers, is a genus of large ichneumon wasps, with some species known for having the longest ovipositors of any insects. They are idiobiont endoparasitoids of the larvae of wood-boring horntail wasps. The ovipositor can be mistaken for a large stinger.

Species 
Species within the genus: 
Megarhyssa arisana
Megarhyssa atomistica
Megarhyssa atrata
Megarhyssa aurantia
Megarhyssa babaulti
Megarhyssa belulliflava
Megarhyssa bicolor
Megarhyssa bonbonsana
Megarhyssa cultrimacularis
Megarhyssa fulvipennis
Megarhyssa gloriosa
Megarhyssa greenei
Megarhyssa hainanensis
Megarhyssa indica
Megarhyssa insulana
Megarhyssa jezoensis
Megarhyssa laniaria
Megarhyssa lenticula
Megarhyssa longitubula
Megarhyssa macrurus
Megarhyssa middenensis
Megarhyssa mirabilis
Megarhyssa nortoni
Megarhyssa obtusa
Megarhyssa perlata
Megarhyssa praecellens
Megarhyssa recava
Megarhyssa rixator
Megarhyssa rotundamacula
Megarhyssa strimacula
Megarhyssa superba
Megarhyssa taiwana
Megarhyssa vagatoria
Megarhyssa verae
Megarhyssa weixiensis
Megarhyssa wugongensis

References

External links
 Bugguide.net
 Photo Essay: Giant Ichneumon Wasps Ovipositing
 Reference Photos: Giant Ichneumon Wasps - Male Megarhyssa sp.
 Video: Giant Ichneumon Wasp Ovipositing

Insects used as insect pest control agents
Biological pest control wasps
Ichneumonidae genera
Ichneumonidae
Taxa named by William Harris Ashmead